The following is a list of ancient Baltic peoples and tribes.

Background
This is a list of the ancient Baltic peoples and tribes. They spoke the Baltic languages (members of the broader Balto-Slavic), a branch of the Indo-European language family, which was originally spoken by tribes living in area east of Jutland peninsula, southern Baltic Sea coast in the west and Moscow, Oka and Volga rivers basins in the east, to the northwest of the Eurasian steppe. Modern descendants are the Lithuanians and Latvians (they themselves assimilated other related Baltic tribes).

List of ancient Baltic peoples and tribes (table)

†Extinct

Ancestors

Proto-Indo-Europeans (Proto-Indo-European speakers)
Proto-Balto-Slavs (common ancestors of Balts and Slavs) (Proto-Balto-Slavic speakers)
Proto-Balts (Proto-Baltic speakers)

List of Ancient Baltic peoples and tribes (kinship tree)

Balts
Eastern Balts
Eastern Galindians
Eastern (Middle) Balts
Latgalians (Latgaļi / Letgaļi / Leti) (they lived in Latgalia - Latgola)
Latvians (they were formed by the merger of Latgalians, as the main component, with the Selonians, Semigallians, Curonians and Livonians, the last ones are a Baltic-Finnic people and not a Baltic Indo-European one) (they live in Latvia)
Transitional Balts (between Latgalians and Lithuanians)
Selonians (they lived in Selonia - Sēlija)
Semigallians (they lived in Semigallia - Zemgale)
Curonians (they lived in Curonia or Courland)
Curonian Kings (Kuršu Koniņi) (a distinct Latvian cultural group of Curonian ancestry) (they live in seven villages between Kuldīga and Aizpute in Courland)
Kursenieki (although they adopted a Latvian dialect, with Curonian substrate, they keep a distinct Curonian ethnic identity and name) (they lived in the Curonian and Vistula Spits)
Lithuanians (Lietuviai) (they were formed by the merger of Aukštaitians and Samogitians along with their smaller tribes) (they live in Lithuania)
Aukštaitians ("Highlanders")
Samogitians ("Lowlanders")  (Žemaitē)
Prussian Lithuanians or Small Lithuanians - Lietuvininkai (they lived in Lithuania Minor, northeastern Prussia)
Western Balts
Scalovians (Skallawai) (they lived in Scalovia - Skallawa)
Prussians (Old Prussians, Baltic Prussians) (Prūsai) (they lived in Prussia, Old Prussia or Baltic Prussia)
Bartians (Bartai) (they lived in Bartia - Barta)
Lubavians (Lubawai) (they lived in Lubavia - Lūbawa)
Nadruvians (Nadrāuwai) (they lived in Nadruvia - Nadrāuwa)
Natangians (Natangai or Notangiai) (they lived in Natangia - Nātanga or Notangi)
Pogesanians (Paguddiai) (they lived in Pogesania - Paguddi)
Pomesanians (Pameddiai) (they lived in Pomesania - Pameddi)
Sambians (Sembai) (they lived in Sambia - Semba)
Sasnans (Sasnai) (they lived in Sasna)
Warmians (Wārmiai) (they lived in Warmia - Wārmi)
Western Galindians (Galindai) (they lived in Western Galindia - Galinda)
Yotvingians (they lived in Yotvingia)

Hypothetical Ancient Baltic peoples and tribes
Eastern Balts
Dniepr-Oka Balts
Dniepr Balts
Oka Balts
Western Balts
Pomeranian Balts

Notes

External links
  E-book of the original.
 
 
 

Lists of ancient Indo-European peoples and tribes
History of the Baltic states
Prehistory of Prussia